Ferdinand II, Archduke of Further Austria (Linz, 14 June 1529 – 24 January 1595, Innsbruck) was ruler of Further Austria and since 1564 Imperial count of Tirol. The son of Ferdinand I, Holy Roman Emperor, he was married to Philippine Welser in his first marriage. In his second marriage to Anna Juliana Gonzaga, he was the father of Anna of Tyrol, future Holy Roman Empress.

Biography 
 
Archduke Ferdinand of Austria was the second son of Ferdinand I, Holy Roman Emperor and Anna of Bohemia and Hungary. He was a younger brother of Emperor Maximilian II. At the behest of his father, he was put in charge of the administration of Bohemia in 1547. He also led the campaign against the Turks in Hungary in 1556.

In 1557, he was secretly married to Philippine Welser, daughter of a patrician from Augsburg, with whom he had several children. The marriage was only accepted by Emperor Ferdinand I in 1559 under the condition of secrecy. The children were to receive the name "of Austria" but would only be entitled to inherit if the House of Habsburg became totally extinct in the male line, and thus the marriage had many qualities of a morganatic marriage. The sons born of this marriage received the title Margrave of Burgau, an ancient Habsburg possession in Further Austria. The younger of the sons, who survived their father, later received the princely title of Fürst zu Burgau.

After his father's death in 1564, Ferdinand became the ruler of Tirol and other Further Austrian possessions under his father's will. However, he remained governor of Bohemia in Prague until 1567 according to the wishes of his brother Maximilian II.

In his own lands, Ferdinand made sure that the Catholic counter-reformation would prevail. He also was instrumental in promoting the Renaissance in central Europe and was an avid collector of art. He accommodated his world-famous collections in a museum built specifically for that purpose, making Ambras Castle Innsbruck the oldest museum in the world, and as the only Renaissance Kunstkammer of its kind to have been preserved at its original location, the Chamber of Art and Curiosities at Ambras Castle Innsbruck represents an unrivalled cultural monument. The collection was started during Ferdinand's time in Bohemia and he subsequently moved it to Tyrol. In particular, the Chamber of Art and Curiosities, the gallery of portraits, and the collection of armor were very expensive, leading Ferdinand to incurred a high level of debt. Part of collections remained in Innsbruck, and part ultimately was moved to the Kunsthistorisches Museum in Vienna.

After the death of his wife Philippine in 1580, he married his niece, Anna Caterina Gonzaga, a daughter of William I, Duke of Mantua, in 1582.

Archduke Ferdinand died on 24 January 1595. Since his sons from the first marriage were not entitled to the inheritance, and the second produced only surviving daughters, Tirol was reunified with the other Habsburg lands. His daughter from the Mantuan marriage to Anna Caterina (later Anna Juliana) became Holy Roman Empress Anna, consort of Emperor Mathias, who received his Further Austrian inheritance.

Children

He and his first wife Philippine Welser were parents of four children:
 Margrave Andrew of Burgau (15 June 1558 – 12 November 1600). Became a cardinal in 1576, Margrave of Burgau in 1578, Bishop of Constance in 1589 and Bishop of Brixen in 1591. He had two illegitimate children.
 Charles, Margrave of Burgau (22 November 1560 – 30 October 1618), Margrave of Burgau. He married his first cousin, Sibylle (1557–1627), the youngest daughter of daughter of William, Duke of Jülich-Cleves-Berg (28 July 1516 – 5 January 1592), and Maria, Archduchess of Austria, daughter of Ferdinand I, Holy Roman Emperor. They had no legitimate children. He and his mistress Chiara Elisa di Ferrero had three illegitimate children.
 Philip of Austria (7 August 1562 – 9 January 1563), twin of Maria.
 Maria of Austria (7 August 1562 – 25 January 1563), twin of Philip.

On 14 May 1582, Ferdinand married his niece Anna Caterina Gonzaga. She was a daughter of William I, Duke of Mantua, and Eleonora of Austria, younger sister of Ferdinand. They were parents to three daughters:
 Archduchess Anna Eleonore of Austria (26 June 1583 – 15 January 1584).
 Archduchess Maria of Austria (16 June 1584 – 2 March 1649), a nun.
 Archduchess Anna of Austria (4 October 1585 – 14 December/15 December 1618); married her first cousin Matthias, Holy Roman Emperor.

He had at least two illegitimate children:

With Anna von Obrizon:
Veronika von Villanders (1551–1589). Married Giovan Francesco di Gonzaga-Novellara, Lord of Campitello.

With Johanna Lydl von Mayenburg:
Hans Christoph von Hertenberg (c. 1592 – 2 September 1613). Married Ursula Gienger.

Ancestors

Notes

External links

Ferdinand II of Austria
Ferdinand II of Austria
16th-century archdukes of Austria
Counts of Tyrol
Knights of the Golden Fleece
Austrian art collectors
Sons of emperors
Children of Ferdinand I, Holy Roman Emperor
Sons of kings
People from Linz